GTU may refer to:

Education 
 Gebze Technical University, in Turkey
 Georgian Technical University, in Georgia
 Graduate Theological Union, a consortium of independent California theological education institutions
 Gujarat Technological University, in Gujarat, India

Other uses 
 Aghu Tharrnggala language (ISO 639:gtu)
 Gamma Theta Upsilon, an honour society in geography
 General Trades Union, a defunct American trade union
 Georgetown Municipal Airport
 Grand Touring Under, a class in the IMSA GT Championship
 Chevrolet Beretta GTU